Let's Make a Million is a 1936 American comedy film directed by Ray McCarey and written by Manuel Seff and Robert Yost. The film stars Charlotte Wynters, Edward Everett Horton, Porter Hall, J. M. Kerrigan, Margaret Seddon and Margaret McWade. The film was released on December 13, 1936, by Paramount Pictures.

Plot

Cast 
Edward Everett Horton as Harrison Gentry
Charlotte Wynters as Caroline
Porter Hall as Spencer
J. M. Kerrigan as Sam Smith
Margaret Seddon as Aunt Martha
Margaret McWade as Aunt Lucy
Purnell Pratt as Gilbert
Irving Bacon as Jerry
Ivan Miller as Peter Winton

References

External links 
 

1936 films
Paramount Pictures films
American comedy films
1936 comedy films
Films directed by Ray McCarey
American black-and-white films
1930s English-language films
1930s American films